Dan Crow may refer to:

Dan Crow (musician),children's musician
Dan Quine (formerly known as Dan Crow), computer scientist previously in charge of Google's web crawler development and currently CTO of Songkick
 Dan Crow, pseudonym for author Ernest Aris (1882–1963)
Danny Crow (born 1986), English footballer